EG-018 is a carbazole-based synthetic cannabinoid that has been sold online as a designer drug. It acts as a partial agonist of the CB1 and CB2 receptor, with reasonably high binding affinity, but low efficacy in terms of inducing a signaling response.

Legal status

EG-018 is a controlled substance in Japan.

See also

References 

Designer drugs
Carbazoles
CB1 receptor agonists